The 2017–18 season was Unione Sportiva Città di Palermo's 1st season in Serie B, the second-highest division of Italian football, after relegation from Serie A by the end of the 2016-17 season.

Players

Squad information
Players and squad numbers last updated on 31 January 2018.Appearances and goals are counted for domestic leagues (Serie A and Serie B) and national cup (Coppa Italia) and correct as of 16 June 2018.Note: Flags indicate national team as has been defined under FIFA eligibility rules. Players may hold more than one non-FIFA nationality.

Transfers

Summer 2017

In

Out

Other acquisitions

Other disposals

Winter 2018

In

Out

Other acquisitions

Other disposals

Total expenditure: €4.15M

Total revenue: €17M

Net income:  €12.85M

Competitions

Overall

Serie B

League table

Results summary

Results by round

Matches

Serie B

Play-offs

Semi-finals

Final

Coppa Italia

Appearances and goals

|-
! colspan=14 style=background:pink; text-align:center| Goalkeepers
|-

|-
! colspan=14 style=background:pink; text-align:center| Defenders
|-

|-
! colspan=14 style=background:pink; text-align:center| Midfielders
|-

|-
! colspan=14 style=background:pink; text-align:center| Forwards

|}

Goalscorers

Clean sheets

Disciplinary record

Attendances

References

Palermo F.C. seasons
Palermo